Im Chae-bin (임채빈, ; born 29 October 1991) is a South Korean professional racing cyclist. He rode at the 2015 UCI Track Cycling World Championships. He also competed at the 2014 Asian Games and won a gold medal in team sprint.

References

External links

1991 births
Living people
South Korean male cyclists
Place of birth missing (living people)
Asian Games medalists in cycling
Cyclists at the 2014 Asian Games
Cyclists at the 2018 Asian Games
Cyclists at the 2016 Summer Olympics
Medalists at the 2014 Asian Games
Medalists at the 2018 Asian Games
Asian Games gold medalists for South Korea
Asian Games bronze medalists for South Korea
Olympic cyclists of South Korea